The teams competing in Group 5 of the 2006 UEFA European Under-21 Championship qualifying competition were Italy, Scotland, Slovenia, Norway, Belarus and Moldova.

Standings

Matches
All times are CET.

 

 

 

 

 Match originally ended 2–2 and awarded to Italy due to Scotland fielding a suspended player.

Goalscorers
 TBD

External links
 Group 5 at UEFA.com

Group 5